The Embraer EMB 202 Ipanema is a Brazilian agricultural aircraft used for aerial application, particularly crop dusting. It is produced by Indústria Aeronáutica Neiva, a subsidiary of Embraer located in Botucatu, Brazil. The latest version of this aircraft is the first ethanol-powered fixed-wing aircraft, which could give it an economical advantage over the gasoline version. The aircraft is widely employed in Brazil, having market share of about 80%, and the 1,000th delivery was completed on 15 March 2005. Besides aircraft, alcohol-conversion kits for gasoline-powered Ipanemas are also sold.

Development
In the 1960s, the development of a Brazilian agriculture aircraft was motivated by the expansion of the agricultural products market, specifically soybean and sugar cane. During this time, the Ipanema aircraft was developed by engineers of the Aeronautics Technological Institute (ITA) on the Ipanema Farm, located in Sorocaba.

The first version of the aircraft, the EMB-200, made its first flight on 30 July 1970 and was certified on 14 December 1971. The aircraft was equipped with a  piston engine. Series production started in 1972 by Embraer. In September 1974, the EMB-201 was introduced, including many improvements such as a  engine, new propeller, new wings and increased capacity.

In 1982, the production of Ipanema was transferred to Indústria Aeronáutica Neiva, recently acquired by Embraer. In 1992, a new model, called EMB-202 or Ipanemão (big Ipanema), was released. The new aircraft had improvements on aerodynamics, a 40% greater capacity, and optional, modern equipment for electrostatic aerial application.

In the following years, Neiva made significant improvements to the aircraft, such as adding winglets to the wingtips, adding an air conditioning system to the cabin, lowering the position of the wings, decreasing resistance and reducing the weight of the exhaust system.

Since ethanol is largely available in Brazil, costing only about 25-30% as much as aviation gasoline, many Brazilian farmers have attempted to fuel gasoline-powered Ipanemas with alcohol, with varying degrees of success. The result of this was the development of an alcohol-powered Ipanema, which was certified by the Brazilian General Command for Aerospace Technology (CTA) on 19 October 2004. The alcohol-fueled Ipanema engine also has 20% lower maintenance and operational costs.

In 2015 an Ipanema with improved winglets was presented on the Agrishow agricultural exposition. The new winglets, designed by the department of Aeronautical Engineering of the University of São Paulo's São Carlos School of Engineering, increased the performance of the aircraft by 20%.

Variants
In parentheses are shown certification dates.
 EMB-200 (December 1971) with a 260 HP Lycoming engine, Mc Cauley propeller and 550 kg capacity.
 EMB-200A (December 1973) similar to EMB-200 with Hartzell propeller and an improved engine.
 EMB-201 (September 1974) with  Lycoming IO-540-K1D5 engine and  capacity,  200 built.
 EMB-201A (April 1977) similar to EMB-201 with new wing profile and wingtips and revised cockpit.
 EMB-201R Single-seat glider-tug aircraft for the Brazilian Air Force. Three were built for the Air Force Academy gliding club. Brazilian Air Force designation U-19.
 EMB-202 (May 1991) with 300 HP Lycoming engine, Hartzell propeller and 950 kg capacity.
 EMB-202A (October 2004) with 320 HP Lycoming engine, using ethanol fuel and a propeller with better performance, lower maintenance and lower operational costs.
 EMB-203 (November 2015) with 320 HP Lycoming engine, certificate in 2015, has a wingspan of 13.3 m and its winglets redesigned, increasing control and improving the efficiency of spraying.

Operators

Brazilian Air Force

Specifications (EMB-202)

See also

References
Notes

Bibliography

 December 2005 issue, pg 60-61, Scientific American
 Embraer Press Release 2005/03/15 NEIVA DELIVERS 1000TH IPANEMA CROP DUSTER
 Embraer Press Release 2004/10/19 ETHANOL-FUELED IPANEMA CERTIFIED BY THE CTA

External links

Embraer
Indústria Aeronáutica Neiva
ITA

Low-wing aircraft
Single-engined tractor aircraft
1970s Brazilian agricultural aircraft
Embraer aircraft
Glider tugs
Aircraft first flown in 1970